Douglas Glen Shirton (born July 15, 1947) is a Canadian former professional ice hockey player who played in the World Hockey Association (WHA). Shirton played part of the 1973–74 WHA season with the Cleveland Crusaders. He was drafted in the fourth round of the 1963 NHL Amateur Draft by the Montreal Canadiens.

Awards
1969–70 MCHA First All-Star Team
1970–71 MCHA First All-Star Team

References

External links

1947 births
Bowling Green Falcons men's ice hockey players
Canadian ice hockey defencemen
Cleveland Crusaders players
Ice hockey people from Ontario
Jacksonville Barons players
Living people
London Nationals players
Montreal Canadiens draft picks
Peterborough Petes (ice hockey) players